The 2022 Los Cabos Open (also known as the Abierto de Tenis Mifel for sponsorship reasons) was an ATP tennis tournament played on outdoor hard courts. It was the 6th edition of the tournament, and part of the ATP Tour 250 series of the 2022 ATP Tour. It took place in Los Cabos, Mexico from 1 through 6 August 2022.

Champions

Singles 

  Daniil Medvedev def.  Cameron Norrie, 7–5, 6–0

Doubles 

  William Blumberg /  Miomir Kecmanović  def.  Raven Klaasen /  Marcelo Melo, 6–0, 6–1

Points and prize money

Point distribution

Prize money 

*per team

Singles main-draw entrants

Seeds 

 Rankings are as of July 25, 2022.

Other entrants
The following players received wildcards into the main draw:
  Alex Hernández 
  Feliciano López 
  Rodrigo Pacheco Méndez

The following players received entry from the qualifying draw:
  Nick Chappell 
  Rinky Hijikata 
  Max Purcell 
  Kaichi Uchida

The following players received entry as lucky losers:
  Nicolás Barrientos
  Gonzalo Villanueva

Withdrawals
Before the tournament
  Fabio Fognini → replaced by  Gonzalo Villanueva
  John Isner → replaced by  Fernando Verdasco
  John Millman → replaced by  Nicolás Barrientos
  Diego Schwartzman → replaced by  Yannick Hanfmann
  João Sousa → replaced by  Ričardas Berankis

Doubles main-draw entrants

Seeds

1 Rankings are as of 25 July 2022.

Other entrants
The following pairs received wildcards into the doubles main draw:
  Facundo Bagnis /  Alex Hernández 
  Ernesto Escobedo /  Rodrigo Pacheco Méndez

The following pair received entry as alternates:
  Radu Albot /  Ričardas Berankis
  Max Schnur /  John-Patrick Smith

Withdrawals 
  Ernesto Escobedo /  Rodrigo Pacheco Méndez → replaced by  Radu Albot /  Ričardas Berankis
  Quentin Halys /  João Sousa → replaced by  Max Schnur /  John-Patrick Smith
  Aleksandr Nedovyesov /  Aisam-ul-Haq Qureshi → replaced by  Tomás Martín Etcheverry /  Tseng Chun-hsin

References

External links 
 

Los Cabos Open
Los Cabos Open
2022
Los Cabos Open